Alexa Jordan Kenin (February 16, 1962 – September 10, 1985) was an American actress known for her supporting roles in several films released during the 1980s, including Little Darlings (1980), Honkytonk Man (1982), and Pretty in Pink (1986) which was released after her death.

Career
Kenin was born in New York City. Her parents divorced when she was young and her mother, actress Maya Kenin, married character actor John Ryan. Kenin began acting as a child and won her first professional part with a supporting role in the 1972 holiday TV special The House Without a Christmas Tree, which starred Jason Robards and Lisa Lucas.

In 1977, Kenin appeared in John Guare's Landscape of the Body at The Public Theater and in the off-Broadway production of Elusive Angel. The following year she played David Janssen's daughter in the television miniseries The Word. In December 1980, she portrayed the role of "Libby" in the touring production of Neil Simon's I Ought to Be in Pictures, starring Bill Macy and Patricia Harty. She also guest starred in several episodes of ABC Afterschool Special, and in the 1982 TV film A Piano for Mrs. Cimino opposite Bette Davis.

At the age of 17, Kenin and her mother moved to Los Angeles after her mother divorced John Ryan. Kenin attended Beverly Hills High School while also maintaining her acting career. In 1979, she was cast in the CBS sitcom Co-Ed Fever. The series was canceled after one episode. The following year, she co-starred in the teen comedy Little Darlings, starring Kristy MacNichol and Tatum O'Neal.

In 1982, Kenin guest-starred on episodes of The Facts of Life and Gimme a Break!.  In the same year she played, in Honkytonk Man, the part of an aspiring young singer alongside Clint Eastwood as he makes his way to Nashville. One of Kenin's final roles was in the John Hughes film Pretty in Pink (1986), released after her death.

Death
On September 10, 1985, Kenin's body was found in her Manhattan apartment. Kenin’s death certificate noted that her death resulted from complications of asthma. She is buried in New Montefiore Cemetery in West Babylon, New York.

Filmography

References

External links

 
 
  (archive)
 

1962 births
1985 deaths
20th-century American actresses
20th-century American Jews
Actresses from New York City
American child actresses
American film actresses
American stage actresses
American television actresses
Burials at New Montefiore Cemetery
Jewish American actresses
People from Manhattan